Canaan Township is one of the sixteen townships of Wayne County, Ohio, United States.  The 2000 census found 4,736 people in the township.

Geography
Located in the northern part of the county, it borders the following townships:
Westfield Township, Medina County - north
Guilford Township, Medina County - northeast corner
Milton Township - east
Green Township - southeast corner
Wayne Township - south
Chester Township - southwest corner
Congress Township - west
Harrisville Township, Medina County - northwest

Parts of two villages are located in Canaan Township: Burbank in the northwest, and Creston in the northeast.

Name and history
Statewide, other Canaan Townships are located in Athens, Madison, and Morrow counties.

Government
The township is governed by a three-member board of trustees, who are elected in November of odd-numbered years to a four-year term beginning on the following January 1. Two are elected in the year after the presidential election and one is elected in the year before it. There is also an elected township fiscal officer, who serves a four-year term beginning on April 1 of the year after the election, which is held in November of the year before the presidential election. Vacancies in the fiscal officership or on the board of trustees are filled by the remaining trustees.

References

External links
Township website
Wayne County township map
County website

Townships in Wayne County, Ohio
Townships in Ohio